Cabbage is the eighth album by Celtic band Gaelic Storm.  It was released on August 3, 2010, and reached #73 on the Billboard 200 on August 21, 2010.

Track listing 
All arrangements by Gaelic Storm.

Personnel 
Gaelic Storm
 Patrick Murphy – accordion, spoons, bodhrán, lead vocals
 Steve Twigger – guitar, bouzouki, mandolin, bodhrán, lead vocals
 Ryan Lacey – djembe, doumbek, surdo, cajón, vocals, various percussion
 Peter Purvis – Highland bagpipes, Uilleann pipes, Deger pipes, whistle, vocals
 Jessie Burns – fiddle, vocals

Additional Personnel
 Jeff May – bass
 Kevin Smith – bass
 David Boyle – keyboards
 Michael Ramos – accordion

References 

Gaelic Storm albums
2010 albums